Cerasus may refer to:

Plants and fruits 

 Cerasus,
 a dated synonym of the genus Prunus
 a subgenus of the genus Prunus, see Prunus subg. Cerasus
 Prunus cerasus (sour cherry), a species of Prunus in the subgenus Cerasus
 Cherry, some of which are members of Prunus subg. Cerasus

Places 
Κερασοῦς, towns on the Black Sea coast of Asia Minor:

 Cerasus (near Trapezus), near Vakfıkebir
 Giresun, ancient provincial capital of Giresun Province in the Black Sea Region of northeastern Turkey